Imscared (stylized as IMSCARED) is an indie horror video game created by Ivan Zanotti. This game features an unnamed protagonist in a room, unable to escape due to the door needing a heart to open it. Upon the player investigating, they find a little key under a table which can be used to open a wardrobe, revealing blood and a hidden entrance through which the player must pass if they want to find a way out of the room. Eventually, the player finds themself chased by beings known as "White Face" and "HER" that can create and alter files on the player's computer, close the game, and more.

The game has received positive reviews from critics, praising the retro-style graphics, sound design, and the "out-of-game" elements like creating and altering files as well as the game closing itself and creating a fake BSOD, while criticizing the confusing plot. It is one of the earliest examples of a game altering files on one's computer, paving the way for games like Undertale and Doki Doki Literature Club.

On October 12, 2022, the game got a major revamp for its 10th anniversary, including being remastered to 60 fps. The original version of the game can still be played and can be accessed in settings.

Gameplay 
The game has simple WASD controls. The game and its antagonists try to deceive the player, and the player must edit files in a folder that the game creates on the player's desktop in order to progress. The antagonists can create, edit, and alter files, and if you are caught by one the game closes and creates a fake BSOD.

Plot 
This game's plot is left vague intentionally throughout the entire game. The game begins in a room with a hidden entrance in the corner that leads to a basement where there are a series of doors. Going inside one of the unlocked doors reveals a chair and two bookshelves; the right bookshelf hiding a key that the player must crouch to reach. Upon getting this key, the player can use it on one of the other doors in which they will find a hallway with flesh-like walls. At the end of the hallway a heart can be found. Upon collecting the heart and going back to the room the player starts in, an antagonist "White Face" (literally a floating white face) chases the player. If White Face catches the player, a fake BSOD appears.

Later in the game, antagonist "HER" tries to hinder the player, similar to White Face. HER has a face very similar to White Face's, but rather than being a disembodied head, HER has a body that is featureless and white and floats above the ground. It is revealed at the end of HER's section that "HER" is a variation of White Face.

Reception 
The game's 2012 and 2016 releases became a viral hit on various media platforms--especially YouTube--in large part due to the way the game messes with the player's computer. It is one of the first games to ever do this and set a precedent for other computer-altering games that succeed it. Rock Paper Shotgun praised the retro-style like graphics and its scares. In 2012, PC Gamer praised the 2012 release for the psychological horror and it's "devious" out-of-game elements. In 2014, Polygon praised the 2012 release for its puzzles, and that it's terrifying throughout. In 2022, IGN rated the game's 2016 release one of the twelve best horror games for PC.

References

External links 
 

2016 video games
2012 video games
2010s horror video games
Indie video games
First-person video games
Video games developed in Italy
Windows games